Tony Cameron (born 21 March 1941) is an Irish equestrian. He competed at the 1960 Summer Olympics and the 1964 Summer Olympics.

References

External links
 

1941 births
Living people
Irish male equestrians
Olympic equestrians of Ireland
Equestrians at the 1960 Summer Olympics
Equestrians at the 1964 Summer Olympics
Place of birth missing (living people)